Daniel Kjörling (born 12 November 1973) is a Swedish former bandy player who most recently played for Västerås SK as a goalkeeper.

Career

Club career
Kjörling is a youth product of Uppsala BoIS and has represented Sandviken and Västerås.

International career
Kjörling was part of Swedish World Champions team of 2003

Honours

Country
 Sweden
 Bandy World Championship: 2003

References

External links
 

1973 births
Living people
Swedish bandy players
Sandvikens AIK players
Västerås SK Bandy players
Sweden international bandy players
Bandy World Championship-winning players